Gordon's Great Escape is a television series presented by chef Gordon Ramsay.

Series 1 follows Ramsay's first visit to India, where he explores the country's culinary traditions.  Produced by One Potato Two Potato, in association with Optomen, the series aired on three consecutive nights between 18 and 20 January 2010 as part of Channel 4's 'Indian Winter' promotion.

The second series aired in May 2011, where Ramsay explored the culinary traditions of Southeast Asia, visiting Thailand, Cambodia, Malaysia, and Vietnam.

Background
Ramsay had taken an interest in Indian cuisine since his mother took him out for curry as a child.  His mother also learned curry recipes from their Indian landlord in Birmingham.  In 2009, he filmed the series in the midst of financial and personal problems back home.  Ramsay stated, "It was me and a rucksack and a month of being on the road going back to what I love doing best — cooking...One minute I was all over the newspapers, the next I was on a continent where no one really knew who I was."

Episodes

References

External links

Production site

2010 British television series debuts
2011 British television series endings
Channel 4 original programming
British cooking television shows
Food travelogue television series
Television shows filmed in India
Television shows filmed in Cambodia
Television shows filmed in Vietnam
Television shows filmed in Malaysia
Television shows filmed in Thailand